Bernhard Fries (16 May 1820 – 21 May 1879) was a German landscape painter. He is associated with the Düsseldorf school of painting.

Biography
He was born in Heidelberg. He studied under Carl Koopmann in Karlsruhe, and from 1835 to 1837 at the Academy of Fine Arts, Munich, under Cornelius. He traveled in France and Austria, and stayed for a few years (1838–1840 and 1843–1846) in Italy. He spent some time from 1840 to 1843 at the Academy in Düsseldorf. Amongst his most important works is the cycle of 40 Italian landscapes (now in Munich) that have been compared by some to the famous cycle by Carl Rottmann. Fries' Italian landscapes show careful composition and execution. After the completion of the series in 1866 he created the Italian views and Palermo Mamellen (in Schack Museum in Munich), Civitella, Garda, Rome, Naples, Palermo etc. as well as views of Heidelberg and motifs from the surrounding area. Fries died in Munich in 1879.

A rich collection of drawings and sketchbooks and some of the most important oil paintings showing southern Italian seaside landscapes between Rome and Naples as well as Palermo are in the private collection of a descendant. His paintings are represented in various museums, such as the great art galleries and museums in Darmstadt, Halle, Karlsruhe, Munich (Neue Pinakothek and Schackgalerie), Stuttgart and Zurich. The Palatinate Museum in Heidelberg has a comprehensive collection of works by Fries.

Family
Fries was son of the wealthy banker, manufacturer of madder and collector of fine arts and paintings, . His very valuable art collection comprised important Dutch painting of the period 1700–1800, paintings of Claude Lorrain, Poussin, Joseph Anton Koch and George Augustus Wallis.  He is brother of the painter Ernst Fries. He was born in the art-loving family of bankers, which allowed him, unlike his colleagues, to live, travel and paint free of any financial worries. He was the nephew of the chemistry professor Karl Wilhelm Gottlob Kastner, whose pupil was Justus von Liebig.

Sources

External links

1820 births
1879 deaths
19th-century German painters
German male painters
Academy of Fine Arts, Munich alumni
German landscape painters
Artists from Heidelberg
19th-century German male artists
Düsseldorf school of painting